Ukraine competed at the 2013 World Championships in Athletics in Moscow, Russia, from 10 to 18 August 2013.

A team of 60 athletes was announced to represent the country in the event. Among those announced two athletes (Emil Ibrahimov and Viktorya Pyatachenko) were not included to the starting lists narrowing the list of athletes, who actually participated in the relevant events, to 58.

Medallists 

The following Ukrainian competitors won medals at the Championships

Results

Men

Track and road events

Field events

Decathlon

Women

Track and road events

Field events

Heptathlon

References

External links 

 Championships' web-page on IAAF's web-site

Nations at the 2013 World Championships in Athletics
World Championships in Athletics
Ukraine at the World Championships in Athletics